Anthony Gildès (13 August 1856 – 6 October 1941) was a French actor.

Anthony Gildès was born Anatole Gleizes in Metz, France. He died in Paris at age 85.

Selected filmography
 The Zone of Death (1917)
 The Torture of Silence (1917)
 The Man with the Hispano (1926)
 American Love (1931)
 All That's Not Worth Love (1931)
 The Yellow Dog (1932)
 The Red Robe (1933)
 Toto (1933)
 The Abbot Constantine (1933)
 Lake of Ladies (1934)
 Prince Jean (1934)
 Dora Nelson (1935)
 Fanfare of Love (1935)
 27 Rue de la Paix (1936)
 Moutonnet (1936)
 The King (1936)
 Samson (1936)
 The Green Jacket (1937)
 Chaste Susanne (1937)
 The House Opposite (1937)
 Josette (1937)
 The Ladies in the Green Hats (1937)
 The Pearls of the Crown (1937)
 Vidocq (1939)
 Latin Quarter (1939)
 His Uncle from Normandy (1939)
 Entente Cordiale (1939)
 Miquette (1940)
 Radio Surprises (1940)
 Night in December (1941)
 First Ball (1941)
 Portrait of Innocence (1941)
 Caprices (1942)

External links

1856 births
1941 deaths
French male film actors
French male silent film actors
Actors from Metz
20th-century French male actors